Nguyễn Kim Hương (born 10 October 1969) is a Vietnamese wrestler. He competed in the men's freestyle 52 kg at the 1988 Summer Olympics.

References

1969 births
Living people
Vietnamese male sport wrestlers
Olympic wrestlers of Vietnam
Wrestlers at the 1988 Summer Olympics
Place of birth missing (living people)